Diedra wielgusi is a species of moth of the family Tortricidae. It is found in North America, where it has been recorded from Arizona, Nevada, New Mexico, Ontario and Texas.

The moth is about 24–28 mm. The ground colour of the forewings is vinaceous (the colour of red wine) cinnamon, with four brown bars on the basal half of the costa and four brown spots on the apical half of the costa. The hindwings are whitish, suffused with grey to pale grey. Adults have been recorded on wing from September to November.

References

Moths described in 1991
Archipini